Sedrup (formerly Southwarp or Southcote) is a hamlet in Buckinghamshire, England. It is located south west of the town of Aylesbury, close to the villages of Stone, Bishopstone and Hartwell which also provide the name of the civil parish within which Sedrup lies.

Most of the hamlet is within the boundaries of the Sedrup Conservation Area.

Sedrup contains 5 grade II listed structures. 4 of which are cottage and one a house.

World War 2
During World War II, Prisoner of War Camp No. 36 Hartwell Dog Track was located in Sedrup. It was known to house Italian prisoners from 1942 to 1946 and consisted mostly of tents with one hut. A 1946 RAF aerial photo of the site shows camp buildings at Grid reference SP797121 , on what is now the Meadoway housing estate adjacent to Sedrup Lane. Remains of the camp were still evident on the site in the 1950s.

Gallery

References

Hamlets in Buckinghamshire
World War II prisoner of war camps in England